Capital punishment in Alabama is a legal penalty. The state has the highest per capita capital sentencing rate in the United States. In some years, its courts impose more death sentences than Texas, a state that has a population five times as large. However, Texas has a higher rate of executions both in absolute terms and per capita.

Legal process 
When the prosecution seeks the death penalty, the sentence is decided by the jury and at least 10 jurors must concur.

In case of a hung jury during the penalty phase of the trial, a retrial happens before another jury.

In 2023, the Alabama Supreme Court ruled that, when a condemned person appeals, the appellate court does not have to actively look for errors in the original judgment and only has to consider constitutional violations if the objection was already raised at trial. Previously, through 2022, appellate courts had been required to search for errors in the original judgment and to consider any constitutional violations that may have occurred at trial, regardless of whether the trial lawyer had objected.

Until 2017, Alabama was the only state which still allowed a judge to impose death against jury verdict in favor of life imprisonment.

The power of clemency belongs to the Governor of Alabama.

The method of execution is lethal injection, unless the condemned requests electrocution or nitrogen hypoxia. Nitrogen hypoxia was approved in 2018, but as of 2022 it had not yet been used. If the selected method (whether chosen by the offender or by default) is found unconstitutional, state statutes provide the use of "any constitutional method of execution", which would likely include hanging, the gas chamber or firing squad.

In February 2023, following a review of failed lethal injections, Governor Kay Ivey said executions would resume.

Capital crimes 
The following kinds of murder are punishable by death in Alabama:
 Murder by the defendant during a kidnapping in the first degree or an attempt thereof committed by the defendant.
 Murder by the defendant during a robbery in the first degree or an attempt thereof committed by the defendant.
 Murder by the defendant during a rape in the first or second degree or an attempt thereof committed by the defendant; or murder by the defendant during sodomy in the first or second degree or an attempt thereof committed by the defendant.
 Murder by the defendant during a burglary in the first or second degree or an attempt thereof committed by the defendant.
 Murder of any police officer, sheriff, deputy, state trooper, federal law enforcement officer, or any other state or federal peace officer of any kind, or prison or jail guard, while such officer or guard is on duty, regardless of whether the defendant knew or should have known the victim was an officer or guard on duty, or because of some official or job-related act or performance of such officer or guard.
 Murder committed while the defendant is under sentence of life imprisonment.
 Murder done for a pecuniary or other valuable consideration or pursuant to a contract or for hire.
 Murder committed during sexual abuse in the first or second degree or an attempt thereof committed by the defendant.
 Murder committed during arson in the first or second degree committed by the defendant; or murder by the defendant by means of explosives or explosion.
 Murder wherein two or more persons are murdered by the defendant by one act or pursuant to one scheme or course of conduct.
 Murder committed when the victim is a state or federal public official or former public official and the murder stems from or is caused by or is related to his official position, act, or capacity.
 Murder committed during the act of unlawfully assuming control of any aircraft by use of threats or force with intent to obtain any valuable consideration for the release of said aircraft or any passenger or crewmen thereon or to direct the route or movement of said aircraft, or otherwise exert control over said aircraft.
 Murder committed by an offender convicted of any other murder in the 20 years preceding the crime which constitutes the capital crime under Alabama law at the time; 
 Murder is related to the capacity or role of the victim as a witness.
 Murder of a victim less than 14 years of age.
 Murder committed by or through the use of a deadly weapon fired or otherwise used from outside a dwelling while the victim is in a dwelling.
 Murder committed by or through the use of a deadly weapon while the victim is in a vehicle.
 Murder committed by or through the use of a deadly weapon fired or otherwise used within or from a vehicle.
 Murder by the defendant where a court had issued a protective order for the victim against the defendant.

History 
Between 1812 and 1965, 708 people were executed in Alabama. Until 1927, hanging was the primary method of execution, although one person was shot.

In addition to murder, capital crimes in Alabama formerly included rape, arson, and robbery. According to the Alabama Department of Corrections, 31 persons were executed by the state for crimes other than murder - including rape, robbery and burglary - between 1927 and 1959. In Kennedy v. Louisiana, 554 U.S. 407 (2008), the U.S. Supreme Court has essentially eliminated the death penalty for any crime at the state level except murder.

The 1972 U.S. Supreme Court case Furman v. Georgia, requiring a degree of consistency in the application of the death penalty, established a de facto moratorium on capital punishment across the United States.  That moratorium remained until July 2, 1976, when Gregg v. Georgia decided how states could impose death sentences without violating the Eighth Amendment's ban against cruel and unusual punishment. Alabama passed legislation reinstating use of the death penalty on March 25, 1976, when Alabama's legislature passed, and Governor George Wallace signed, a new death penalty statute. No execution under this law was carried out until 1983.

Holman Correctional Facility has a male death row that originally had a capacity of 20, but was expanded in the summer of 2000 with the addition of 200 single cells in the segregation unit. The William E. Donaldson Correctional Facility has a male death row with a capacity of 24. Donaldson's death row houses prisoners who need to stay in the Birmingham judicial district. Julia Tutwiler Prison for Women houses the female death row. All executions occur at Holman.

In February 2018, Alabama carried out the botched attempted execution of Doyle Hamm. During the execution attempt, executioners attempted for nearly three hours to insert an IV that could be used to administer the lethal injection drugs. In the process, the execution team punctured Hamm's bladder and femoral artery, causing significant bleeding.

As of June 2018, Alabama had 175 inmates on death row, the 4th highest number in the US. A governor has commuted only one death sentence since 1976: outgoing Governor Fob James commuted Judith Ann Neelley's death sentence to life in prison without parole in January 1999.

In 2016, Jefferson County Circuit Judge Tracie Todd  ruled that the Alabama capital murder provision allowing judges to issue the death penalty by overriding jury recommendations for life without parole to be unconstitutional. In 2020, the Alabama Court of the Judiciary charged Todd with an ethics complaint lodged by the Judicial Inquiry Commission, which accused the Birmingham judge of using her position to oppose and override the state death penalty.  Todd was suspended without pay for 90 days and then permitted to return to her duties as a judge.

On September 23, 2022, Alabama planned to execute Alan Miller but canceled the execution after failing to find a suitable vein. Miller killed a number of his workmates in the 1990s and was sentenced to die.

On November 17, 2022, Alabama failed to execute Kenneth Smith because the state corrections staff were unable to find a suitable vein. Smith was sentenced for the 1988 murder of Elizabeth Sennet.

Following several botched executions, the governor of Alabama, Kay Ivey, announced that executions would be put on hold.

See also

List of people executed in Alabama
List of death row inmates in Alabama
Crime in Alabama
Law of Alabama

References

 
Alabama
Alabama law